The Loakan Road is a , major road in Baguio, Philippines. It provides access to Loakan Airport located in the outskirts of the city. The entire road forms part of National Route 231 (N231) of the Philippine highway network.

In popular culture, the road is considered by paranormal believers to be haunted, by a female vanishing hitchhiker who was said to be a rape victim.

See also
 Highways in the Philippines

References

Roads in Benguet